Griegos is a municipality located in the province of Teruel, Aragon, Spain. According to the 2004 census (INE), the municipality has a population of 137 inhabitants.

The climate is continental Mediterranean, characterized by long, cold winters with little snow though, where temperatures can stay several days at -15 degrees Celsius or less. The summers are mild and some days it is possible to achieve zero temperatures in midsummer.

See also
Montes Universales

References 

Municipalities in the Province of Teruel